The year 1987 in architecture involved some significant architectural events and new buildings.

Events
 August 13 – The first building in England of post-war design to be Listed is Bracken House in the City of London, designed by Sir Albert Richardson as the Financial Times headquarters (1955–59).
 Construction of Ryugyong Hotel in Pyongyang, North Korea, designed by Baikdoosan Architects & Engineers, begins; it will not be completed for 30 years.

Buildings and structures

Buildings opened
 February – The CenTrust Tower in Miami.
 June – The Menil Collection, in Houston, Texas, United States, designed by Renzo Piano.
 August – National Library of New Zealand in Wellington.
 August 17 – One Liberty Place in Philadelphia, United States (Phase 1): the first tenant moves in.

Buildings completed

 The Riga Radio and TV Tower in Riga, Latvia.
 One Atlantic Center in Atlanta, Georgia, US.
 The Shaanxi Provincial TV Tower in Xian, China.
 Comerica Bank Tower in Dallas, Texas, US.
 Metropolitan Tower in Manhattan, New York City, US.
 The JPMorgan Chase Tower in Dallas, Texas, US.
 1000 Second Avenue in Seattle, Washington, US, designed by Donald Winkelmann of NBBJ.
 KPMG Tower in Montreal, Canada
 The tower at Stade Olympique et La Tour de Montréal in Montreal, Quebec, Canada is completed, 11 years after the Olympics took place, after a number of strikes by workers.
 King Saud Mosque, Jeddah, Saudi Arabia.
 The original 7 World Trade Center in Lower Manhattan, New York as the final building in the original World Trade Center complex.
 The Clore Gallery at Tate Britain in London, designed by James Stirling.
 Richmond Riverside, London, designed by Quinlan Terry.
 The Mound Stand at Lord's Cricket Ground in London, designed by Michael Hopkins & Partners.
 Paustian House, a furniture showroom in Copenhagen designed by Jørn Utzon.
 The Pan Pacific Singapore.
 "House on chicken legs" residential apartment building in Saint Petersburg.
 50 Glebe Place in Chelsea, London.
 Southern Outfall Pumping Station, Cleethorpes, England, designed by Sam Scorer.

Awards
 Aga Khan Prize – Jean Nouvel for the Institute of the Arab World in Paris.
 Architecture Firm Award – Benjamin Thompson & Associates, Inc.
 Grand prix national de l'architecture – Jean Nouvel.
 Pritzker Prize – Kenzo Tange.
 Prix de l'Équerre d'Argent – Jean Nouvel and Architecture Studio for the Institute of the Arab World in Paris.
 RAIA Gold Medal – Daryl Jackson.
 RIBA Royal Gold Medal – Ralph Erskine.
 Twenty-five Year Award – Bavinger House.
 UIA Gold Medal – Reima Pietila.

Births

Deaths
 March 16 – Johan Otto von Spreckelsen, Danish architect (born 1929)
 April 22 – Erika Nõva, Estonian architect (born 1905)
 November 15 – Ernő Goldfinger, Hungarian-born architect and furniture designer (born 1902)

References

 
20th-century architecture